Domain Developers Fund (DDF) is the first public open-ended alternative investment fund exclusively invested in Internet domain names. DDF maintains an inventory of websites and domain names, including a wide variety of gTLD and ccTLD domains, from which it extracts advertising revenue through a combination of pay per click advertising, affiliate marketing  and domain parking. Internet domains are perceived as an alternate asset class for investment diversification.

History 

DDF was started in the Cayman Islands in 2008 as a private investment vehicle for a small team of investors led by Michael Marcovici.  The fund's founders pooled their separate domain investments into a single portfolio and, after it proved to be a profitable investment in 2009, allowed families and friends to invest. In February 2010 the fund incorporated in the Cayman Islands and converted to an open-ended investment fund. The current directors and managers of the Fund are Michael Marcovici and Alberto Sanz de Lama. The fund started accepting new investors on 1 August 2010.

Portfolio 
DDF's domains are normally acquired at domain name auctions and drop auctions, a practice that bolsters portfolio liquidity and facilitates quick resale of domains. DDF uses mass registrations at TLD launches and in emerging markets to expand its portfolio. The geographical breakdown for DDF's portfolio by domains is 45% emerging markets such as India, Colombia, Ukraine, China, Nigeria, 40% developed markets in Europe and North America and 15% in cash. The funds management rarely releases information about sales or acquisitions, recently DNJournal released news about the Fund selling cars.net which became the 5th highest sale ever in the .net TLD. The portfolio's themes are law, medicine, retail, pharmaceuticals, banking, finance, insurance and food.

Fees 

DDF has issued Class A shares for individuals and Class B shares for institutions. Class A shares charge a 2.5% management fee and a 25% incentive fee. Class B shares charge a 2% management fee and a 20% incentive fees.  All shares are subject to a 5% hurdle rate – there is no incentive fee charged on the first 5% of returns. The lockup period is six months, and the fund uses up to 2x leverage.

Management owns 55% of DDF and reinvests 50% of performance fee revenue.

Facts 
The following is a summary of disclosed facts mandated by the Cayman Islands Jurisdiction

References

External links 
 Domain Developers Fund
 Perils Of Parking

Investment